Zair, Zabar, Pesh is a 1974 Pakistani television series written by Haseena Moin and directed by Ishrat Ansari and produced by Shireen Khan and Zaheer Khan.

Synopsis 
The story is about Sabeen (Roohi) and Khadim (Shakeel) both of them are from rich families but have their own dreams to pursue. Khadim is pressured by his mother to marry someone and Sabeen lives with her foster mother who wants to see her happy.

Cast 
 Roohi Bano as Sabeen
 Shakeel as Khadim
 Arsh Muneer as Laddan Khala
 Begum Khurshid Mirza as Sabeen's mother
 Zeenat Yasmeen as Sahira
 Ishrat Hashmi as Munni
 Jamshed Ansari as Sharjee
 Qazi Wajid as Houseboy
 Mahmood Ali as Grocery Store salesman

Production

Casting 
It reunited Begum Khurshid Mirza and Haseena Moin as they both previously worked in drama Kiran Kahani it was the second on-screen appearance of Begum Khurshid Mirza and Roohi Bano after drama Kiran Kahani.

References

External links
 

1970s Pakistani television series
Pakistan Television Corporation original programming
Pakistani drama television series
Urdu-language television shows